Farmery is a surname. Notable people with the surname include:

Jack Farmery (1901–1971), English professional footballer
John Farmery (1591–1647), English politician
John Farmery (died 1590), English physician